The Diocese of Talibon is one of the 72 ecclesiastical territories called dioceses of the Roman Catholic Church in the Philippines.

History 
The Diocese is one of two dioceses in the province of Bohol and part of the ecclesiastical province of the Archdiocese of Cebu.  It was created on January 9, 1986, separating half the civil province of Bohol from the Diocese of Tagbilaran. then Pope John Paul II appointed Auxiliary Bishop Christian Vicente Noel as the First Bishop of Talibon, the Diocese comprises the northeastern municipalities of Bohol, consisting of coastal municipalities starting from Inabanga in the northwest to Jagna in the southeast and interior municipalities bounded by Carmen and Sierra Bullones.  There are 7 vicariates in the diocese comprising 37 parishes and ministered to by 101 priests.  There are also 53 religious sisters active in the running of 16 secondary Catholic schools.

Bishops

See also
 Diocese of Tagbilaran
 Archdiocese of Cebu
 List of the Roman Catholic dioceses of the Philippines

References

External links
Diocese of Talibon www.cbcponline.net
Cathedral of Talibon www.bohol-philippines.com
Catholic dioceses in the Philippines by GCatholic
Diocese of Talibon by GCatholic

Talibon
Talibon
Talibon
Roman Catholic dioceses and prelatures established in the 20th century
1986 establishments in the Philippines
Religion in Bohol